Gottfried Inden (June 1, 1827 – August 1, 1896) was an American politician.

Born in Prussia, Inden settled in Granville, Wisconsin and managed a hotel. He served as Granville town clerk and supervisor. In 1885, Inden served in the Wisconsin State Assembly and was a Democrat.

Notes

1827 births
1896 deaths
People from Granville, Wisconsin
German emigrants to the United States
Businesspeople from Wisconsin
Wisconsin city council members
19th-century American politicians
19th-century American businesspeople
Democratic Party members of the Wisconsin State Assembly